Isabelle Moretti (born 5 May 1964 in Lyon) is a French classical harpist.

Biography 
Moretti studied harp at the Conservatoire de Lyon, then at the Conservatoire de Paris where she is a teacher.

In 2006, she premiered the harp concertos by Philippe Hersant and Michèle Reverdy.

In 2007, Moretti played "La Source" by Alphonse Hasselmans in the episode "Les Sons de la nature" of Jean-François Zygel's TV program .

In 2015, she performed the Polish premiere of Karol Beffa's Concerto pour harpe.

Selected discography 
 Sonates pour harpe by Casella, C.P.E. Bach, Dussek, Hindemith, Tailleferre, Harmonia Mundi, 1987.
 Ravel, Debussy, Caplet, Cras, Musique de chambre pour harpe, with the Parisii Quartet, Michel Moraguès (flute), Pascal Moraguès (clarinet), Dominique Desjardin (double bass), Auvidis Valois, 1995.
 André Caplet, Le Miroir de Jésus, Inscriptions champêtres, with the Quatuor Ravel, Michel Chanu, Hanna Schaer, female choir Bernard Têtu directed by Bernard Têtu, Musidisc Accord, 1996.
 Joaquín Rodrigo, Concierto serenata, with the Real Orquesta Sinfónica de Sevilla directed by Edmon Colomer, Auvidis Valois, 1999.
 Alberto Ginastera, Concerto pour harpe, with the Orchestre national de Lyon directed by David Robertson, Naïve Records, 2000 (Prix Charles Cros en 2001)
 Witold Lutosławski, Double concerto pour hautbois et harpe, with François Leleux (oboe) and the Sinfonietta Cracovia directed by Robert Kabara, Arion, 2004.
 Cantare, La voix de la Harpe, with Felicity Lott, Naïve Records, 2009.

Awards 
 1996: Victoire de la musique, classical, new talent.
 2001: Prize of the Académie Charles-Cros for the Concierto serenata by Rodrigo
 2007: She is made a Chevalier of the Ordre national du Mérite

References

External links 
 Official site
 Isabelle Moretti, la harpe et la terre on La Croix
 Isabelle Moretti on France Musique
 Isabelle Moretti : Je suis une harpiste bio, je ne prends pas d'engrais on France Info
 Isabelle Moretti-François on the site of the Conservatoire de Paris
 Isabelle Moretti on Festivalauxchandelles.fr
 Isabelle Moretti "Granada" on the site of the Institut national de l'audiovisuel (14 March 2001)

French classical harpists
Conservatoire de Paris alumni
Academic staff of the Conservatoire de Paris
Knights of the Ordre national du Mérite
Musicians from Lyon
1964 births
Living people